Charles W. Moore may refer to:
 Charles Moore (architect), American architect and educator
 Charles W. Moore (American football), American football coach and player
 Charles W. Moore Jr., U.S. Navy admiral

See also
 Charles Moore (disambiguation)